The El Dorado Park neighborhood of Long Beach, California, is on the east side of the city adjacent to the large El Dorado Regional Park. Lakewood is north of El Dorado Park, while Hawaiian Gardens is northeast, and  Los Alamitos is east of El Dorado Park. The park is bounded on the east by the 605 Freeway, on the north by the Long Beach Towne Center shopping mall, and on the south by Stearns Street. Because of the barrier of the freeway and park between the neighborhood and the rest of Long Beach, as well as the barrier created by near Norwalk Blvd and the Coyote Creek and the neighboring cities, the El Dorado Park neighborhood feels quite separate.

The regional park sits in a flood zone, and it protects residences from spillover from the neighboring San Gabriel River.  Additional undeveloped land south of Willow street near the confluence of Coyote Creek and the San Gabriel River is held by Southern California Edison, and some designated to become part of the park's Nature Center. 

With a median household income of $130,959, El Dorado Park is reportedly the wealthiest neighborhood in Long Beach.

History

El Dorado Park Estates was developed by S&S Construction, now known as Shapell Industries, beginning in 1963. The company was co-founded by David Shapell, Nathan Shapell, and Max Webb in 1955. It was the first large neighborhood to be developed by the company.

Douglas A. Newcomb Academy opened to 300 students in September, 1963.

The park was developed in 1968 after the land was sold to the City of Long Beach by members of the Bixby family and was financed using bond money floated in the 1950s and '60s, and the varied topography comes from soil removed to construct the San Gabriel Freeway.

El Dorado Regional Park

Amenities

Disc golf course, outdoor archery range, baseball/softball field, basketball court, community center, cross country running, physical fitness course (12 stations), barbecue and picnic areas, playground, roller hockey court, skate park, soccer fields, restrooms, tennis court, volleyball court, three fishing lakes and a fishing pond, an airfield for remote control planes and a radio-controlled model sailboat area, pedal boats (rental), children's (adults, too) train (extra cost), and a 100-acre nature center. The city's tree farm on the site closed in the 1990s.

Bicycle paths
Both the Coyote Creek Bicycle Path and the San Gabriel River Bicycle Path cross the neighborhood. A 4-mile bikeway runs through the 450-acre El Dorado Regional Park and connects with the San Gabriel River Bike Trail at various locations.

Police Department Academy
The Long Beach Police Department maintains a police academy on the northern end of the park, complete with a pistol range.

1984 Summer Olympics

During the 1984 Summer Olympics in neighboring Los Angeles, the park was the site for the archery competitions. A temporary venue was set up as a result.

Former Naval Hospital
70 acres at the north end of the park was sold by the City of Long Beach to the Navy for $1 in 1965 to build a new naval hospital, replacing its World War II-era facilities located on Pacific Coast Highway on the facilities later used by the (closed) Brooks College and now as student housing at Cal State Long Beach. It became known for its alcoholism treatment program which launched in 1967 and became known as the hub of the military's dependency program. Perhaps its most famous patient was Betty Ford, who was admitted for drug and alcohol dependence in 1978. Another famous patient was Nazi war criminal Andrija Artukovic. This hospital closed in 1994 along with the closing of the Long Beach Naval Shipyard and Naval Station and disbanding of the Long Beach Naval Fleet. Rather than returning the land to park use, the city proposed a shopping mall. After years of legal battles by neighboring cities, who were concerned with the loss of sales tax revenue as well as competition with their own shopping malls, the center opened in 2000.

Camp Fire Campground
Camp Fire operates a 7-acre developed camping facility including a challenge course featuring rock walls, and high and low ropes course at the north end of the park between the San Gabriel River, the Long Beach Towne Center, and Heartwell Golf Course, leasing land owned by the city of Long Beach as part of Heartwell Park. Prior to the construction of the shopping center, this maintained an unbroken contiguity of open land between Heartwell Park and El Dorado Park.

Movies and television
El Dorado Park Estates appears in the 1967 romantic comedy Luv (film).

See also
Neighborhoods of Long Beach, California

References

External links
Official site

Venues of the 1984 Summer Olympics
Olympic archery venues
Defunct sports venues in California
Neighborhoods in Long Beach, California
Tourist attractions in Long Beach, California
Parks in Los Angeles County, California